Matthew Ziff (born March 24, 1991, in Englewood, New Jersey) is an American actor and producer. As a child model he was represented by Wilhelmina Models. Presently he acts in and sometimes is a producer of feature films.

Early life
From a very early age Ziff has appeared on several television series, films, and numerous commercials including TV and Radio. Ziff is the son of philanthropist and insurance broker, Laurence F. Ziff and actress and real estate investor, Lorraine Ziff. Ziff attended the Blair Academy.

Acting and producing career
Ziff's professional career started just a few months after his birth. Ziff was signed by Wilhelmina Models in New York City. His first TV appearance was on The David Letterman Show while only a few months old. He has been featured in numerous print ads and campaigns including in  Glamour magazine. Ziff appeared on dozens of toy boxes as well as several TV commercials for companies such as Reddi-wip and FedEx.
At the age of eight Ziff was a guest star on Late Night with Conan O’Brien in a skit called "Late Night with Matthew Ziff". He starred in the 2012 film, Treachery, and appears in the long delayed film Mansion of Blood, starring Robert Picardo and Gary Busey. Ziff is also the executive producer of "Six Gun Savior" and a co-producer of "Mansion of Blood". Ziff then played "Bronco"  in the 2016 the Kickboxer reboot, Kickboxer Vengeance starring Jean-Claude Van Damme.

Ziff has received good notices for his role in "Treachery". Film critic Nick W. Nicholson reviewing the feature for CNN radio Houston remarks "it is very refreshing to see the newbie in Ziff match the thespian punches of the seasoned veteran in Biehn (Michael) with such gusto and panache.

Personal life
As an athlete he played quidditch in the 2012 International Quidditch Association (IQA) Global Games for Team USA where they won gold. He also played and coached quidditch at the University of Miami for five years as a "beater" while attending. He graduated in May 2014 with a bachelor's and master's in industrial engineering. His thesis research on the lumbar spine, A Novel Approach for Predicting In-Vivo Lumbar Spine Loads and Kinematics Based on Motion Analysis, was presented at the 7th World Biomechanics Congress in Boston in July 2014. Because of his engineering background, he was featured in Exxon Mobil's TV Spot "Be An Engineer". Ziff plays five instruments and collects rare bass guitars. In 2017, Ziff began studying for a MS in Biomedical Engineering at City College of New York under Dr Mitchell Schaffler, which he completed in 2020. In 2020, Ziff joined the CCNY Master's in Translational Medicine program as a Resident Biodesign Mentor and Adjunct Lecturer

Filmography

Awards
 Sunscreen Film Festival  – Best Up & Coming Actor for Treachery (2013)
 Hoboken International Film Festival  – Best Actor for Treachery (2014)
 Action Martial Arts Magazine Hall of Honors 2015  – Rising Star Award (2015)
 Action Martial Arts Magazine Hall of Honors 2015  – Outstanding Achievements in the Martial Arts (2015)
 Sunscreen Film Festival  – Best Supporting Actor for The Martial Arts Kid (2015)

References

External links
 
 

1991 births
Living people
American male child actors
American male television actors
People from Englewood, New Jersey
American child models